Nikhil D'Souza (born 21 November 1981) is a singer, songwriter and guitarist from Mumbai, India, and is now signed to East West Records of Warner Music UK.

Early life
Nikhil D'Souza was born and brought up in Mumbai and majored in Geology from St. Xavier's College, Mumbai but returned to his musical roots after an encounter with a friend.

Career
Nikhil's genre and musical style can be loosely defined as eclectic acoustic guitar-based pop. His songs have a full melodic quality to them due to his use of alternative tunings (favoured by such artists as Nick Drake and Jeff Buckley). Nikhil's major musical influences are Sting and Jeff Buckley. He was the South Asia Soloist Winner at SUTASI '09.

Nikhil has released four songs with East West Records, a label owned by Warner Music UK. These include Silver and Gold and Beautiful Mind.

Rolling Stone Music Magazine in India has favourably featured Nikhil's music several times: Neha Sharma from Rolling Stone said his "strength as a songwriter is well established in his numerous gripping compositions. Most of his songs shiver with this arresting melancholy as his falsetto glides over twangy guitar riffs”. India Today also included Nikhil as part of their "Faces of the Future," and he has featured on MTV's COKE Studio series and Sofar Sounds.

Discography

References

External links

1981 births
Singers from Mumbai
Bollywood playback singers
Living people
St. Xavier's College, Mumbai alumni
Indian male singer-songwriters
Indian singer-songwriters
Acoustic guitarists
Indian guitarists
21st-century guitarists
21st-century Indian male singers
21st-century Indian singers
Indian Christians